is a Japanese four-panel surreal comedy manga series written and illustrated by Tsukumizu. It began serialization in Media Factory's Comic Cune magazine on January 26, 2019. The first tankōbon volume was published in Japan on February 28, 2020.

Plot 
Shimeji Simulation follows Shijima Tsukishima, a former hikikomori who decides to attend high school. As she gets ready for school, however, she finds shimeji (a type of mushroom) sprouting from her head. At school, Shijima befriends Majime Yamashita, a girl sporting a fried egg on her head.

Characters 

 (VOMIC)
A former hikikomori with shimeji mushrooms growing from her head, who decides to go to school after two years of living in a closet.

 (VOMIC)
A girl born with a fried egg on her head, who becomes Shijima's first real friend after a prolonged period of self-isolation.

Originally appearing in Girls' Last Tour, another work by Tsukumizu, Chito and Yuuri have a cameo in Shimeji Simulation. Yuuri is a convenience store worker, and both girls happen to live in the same apartment complex as Shijima.

Publication
Shimeji Simulation is written and illustrated by Tsukumizu. The series began in Media Factory's Comic Cune magazine on January 26, 2019. The first volume was released on February 28, 2020.

Volume list

Reception 
Jacob Parker-Dalton of Otaquest calls Shimeji Simulation a continuation of the imaginativeness of Girls' Last Tour, and compares the dour/dashing dynamic between Shijima and Majime to Chito and Yuuri in a May 2020 review. Matthew England of CBR, meanwhile, ranks it as number eight on their list of 5 Manga That Need An Anime Adaptation (& 5 That You Didn't Know Already Have One).

References 

Media Factory manga
Kadokawa Dwango franchises
Seinen manga
Surreal comedy anime and manga
Yonkoma